Amuro Tsuzuki (都筑 有夢路, Tsuzuki Amuro; born 5 April 2001) is a Japanese professional surfer. She competed at the 2020 Summer Olympics, in Women's shortboard, winning a bronze medal.

Career 
In 2019, she won the World Junior championship. She competed on the World Surf League Tour.

References

External links
Profile in World Surf League

Living people
2001 births
Japanese surfers
Olympic surfers of Japan
Surfers at the 2020 Summer Olympics
People from Tokorozawa, Saitama
Olympic bronze medalists for Japan
Medalists at the 2020 Summer Olympics
Olympic medalists in surfing
Sportspeople from Saitama Prefecture
21st-century Japanese women